Artur Aleksandrowiç Gevorkýan (born 22 November 1984) is a professional Turkmen footballer who currently plays for FC Ahal and the Turkmenistan national football team.

Career
Of Armenian origin, Gevorkyan currently plays for Nasaf Qarshi since 2011. Before joining Nasaf he played for Pakhtakor Tashkent. In 2011 Gevorkyan won 2011 AFC Cup with Nasaf, scoring 4 goals in tournament and 11 goals in League matches.

In 2013 season Gevorkyan scored 18 goals, only one goal less than best scorer Oleksandr Pyschur. He was named on 2014 Uzbekistan Football award ceremony the UzPFL Player of the Year. He was named four times UzPFL Player of the Month in 2013 season. Gevorkyan became in 2014 best League goalscorer, scoring again 18 goals in League matches. In 2015, he won with Nasaf his first Uzbek Cup, scoring in final match against Bunyodkor on 17 October 2015 first goal of Nasaf. On 17 February 2016 in Uzbekistan Super Cup match against the current champion Pakhtakor Gevorkyan scored on 40-minute the only goal of the match, securing victory of his club. He made significant contribution to the club's Cup victories in 2015.

On 4 March 2016 he was announced by Uzbekistan Football Federation for the 2nd time Uzbek League Player of Year in 2015 according to the survey results among sport journalists.

In March 2019 as a free agent, he moved to the Turkmen FC Ahal, in the Ýokary Liga.
 
In April 2019 on the rights of a free agent, signed a one-year contract with the football club Persib Bandung from Indonesia. In August 2019, Persib Bandung and Artur Gevorkyan decided to terminate the contract by mutual desire.

International career
He played for Turkmenistan futsal team at 2006 AFC Futsal Championship.

He made his debut for Turkmenistan on 11 October 2007 in the 2010 FIFA World Cup qualification match against Cambodia. In his 2nd match for national team on 28 October 2007, 2nd leg match against Cambodia in Ashgabat ended with 4–1 score, Gevorkyan scored two goals.

Career statistics

Club

International

Statistics accurate as of match played 9 November 2016

International goals

Honours

Club

Nasaf Qarshi
Uzbek Cup (1) 2015
Uzbekistan Super Cup (1) 2015
Uzbek League runner-up: 2011
Uzbek Cup runner-up (3): 2011, 2012, 2013
AFC Cup (1): 2011

Lokomotiv
Uzbek League (1) 2016
Uzbek Cup (1) 2016

Individual
 UzPFL Player of the Month (5): March 2013, June 2013, August 2013, October 2013, September 2014
 Uzbek League Player of Year: 2013, 2015
 Uzbek League Foreign Footballer of the Year (2): 2013, 2014
Uzbek League Top Scorer: 2014 (18 goals)
AFC Cup MVP (1): 2011

References

External links

Turkmenistan footballers
Turkmenistan international footballers
Turkmenistan people of Armenian descent
Ethnic Armenian sportspeople
Living people
1984 births
Sportspeople from Ashgabat
FC Kyzylzhar players
FC Aşgabat players
Pakhtakor Tashkent FK players
FC Nasaf players
FC Ahal players
Persib Bandung players
Liga 1 (Indonesia) players
Association football forwards
Turkmenistan expatriate footballers
Expatriate footballers in Kazakhstan
Expatriate footballers in Uzbekistan
Expatriate footballers in Indonesia
Turkmenistan expatriate sportspeople in Kazakhstan
Turkmenistan expatriate sportspeople in Uzbekistan
Turkmenistan expatriate sportspeople in Indonesia
Men's futsal players
AFC Cup winning players